Tysmenytsia is a city in Ivano-Frankivsk Raion, Ivano-Frankivsk Oblast of western Ukraine. It hosts the administration of Tysmenytsia urban hromada, one of the hromadas of Ukraine. Population: .

Geography

The city is also located in very close vicinity to the administrative center of Prykarpattia, Ivano-Frankivsk. It has a population of 9,600 people according to the Ukrainian Census (2001).

The city is famous for its fur factory "Tysmenytsia" that was established back in 1891. In the Soviet times the factory was the fourth major factory within the fur industry of the Ukrainian SSR.

History

Tysmenytsia was first mentioned in documents from 1143, and in 1449, when the village belonged to the Kingdom of Poland, it received Magdeburg rights from Polish king Kazimierz Jagiellonczyk. At that time, it was a royal town, with a Polish name of Tysmienica. Due to its location near the restless southern border of Poland, Tysmienica was frequently raided and burned to the ground, by the Crimean Tatars and Wallachians.

A local Roman Catholic parish was founded by the Voivode of Braclaw Voivodeship, Mikolaj Potocki. The church was operated by the Dominican friars under prior Szymon Okolski, who opened a school here. At that time, Tysmienica belonged to the Potocki family, who invited Armenian merchants to the town. The Dominican monastery was destroyed in 1676, during the Polish–Ottoman War (1672–76), rebuilt in 1678, and expanded in 1763. In 1759, an Armenian church was opened in Tysmienica.

In 1686, King Jan III Sobieski visited the town, awaiting Polish soldiers, who returned from a raid on Moldova. Sobieski stayed in a house which was later named “Panski Dom”, and which was demolished in 1939. In 1772, Tysmienica was annexed by the Habsburg Empire, and remained in Austrian Galicia until late 1918 (see Partitions of Poland). The town, which burned in several fires, lost its importance to the nearby Stanislawow (now Ivano-Frankivsk), and lost its charter. In 1900, Tysmenytsia was in Tłumacz powiat.

In the interbellum period, Tysmienica returned to Poland, and until the 1939 Invasion of Poland belonged to Stanislawow Voivodeship. In September 1939 it was captured by the Red Army, and Soviet authorities destroyed all ancient buildings, such as the Dominican church, Armenian church, the house of Sobieski, and historic cemetery. Under the German occupation, which began August 1941, the Germans, assisted by the Ukrainian police, murdered or deported to Stanislawow, all of the Jewish community of Tysmenytsia, which had numbered around 1500. Those sent to Stanislawow were later sent to the killing camp, Belzec.  Few of Tysmenytsia's Jews survived  the war.

On March 28, 1982 Tysmenytsia became an administrative center of the former Ivano-Frankivsk Raion. Since then the name of raion was changed correspondingly to its administrative center – Tysmenytsia.

Until 18 July 2020, Tysmenytsia was the administrative center of Tysmenytsia Raion. The raion was abolished in July 2020 as part of the administrative reform of Ukraine, which reduced the number of raions of Ivano-Frankivsk Oblast to six. The area of Tysmenytsia Raion was merged into Ivano-Frankivsk Raion.

People

 Saint Job of Maniava, Ukrainian Orthodox saint born in Tysmenytsia
 Kost Levytsky, Ukrainian politician
 Henry Roth, Jewish American writer
 Oleh Lysheha, Ukrainian poet born in Tysmenytsia
 Jacob Kallmann Freud, father of Sigmund Freud

Sister Cities
 Bandera, Texas, United States

Transport 
Tysmenytsia can be reached by train, bus or by plane to Ivano-Frankivsk, which is about 20 minutes by bus from the city.

Local orientation

Regional orientation

References

External links 
 
 County of Tyśmienica (English version)
 Tysmienica Yizkor book
 Photographs of Jewish sites in Tysmenytsia in Jewish History in Galicia and Bukovina

 
Cities in Ivano-Frankivsk Oblast
Cities of district significance in Ukraine
Stanisławów Voivodeship